Halang Island or Pulau Halang (literally "obstructing island"), is an island in Rokan Hilir, Riau, Indonesia. It has two fishing villages; Front Island (Pulau Halang Depan) and Back Island (Pulau Halang Belakang), both mostly inhabited by Hokkien people who originated from Cin-kang Fujian Province in China. It is located in the mouth of Delta Rokan River. Pulau Halang can be reached from Bagansiapiapi by speedboat in about one hour.

Festival
There are two annual festivals each year: one the 18th of the fourth month on Front Island, and another on the 16th of the sixth month on Behind Island (Chinese Lunar calendar).

Transportation
Motorcycles are the main method of transportation in Pulau Halang.

References

Populated places in Riau
Regencies of Riau